Mississippi Highway 23 (MS 23) is a state highway in Mississippi. The route starts at MS 25 in the town of Smithville. It travels northeastward through the forests of eastern Itawamba County. The highway intersects Interstate 22 (I-22) and U.S. Route 78 (US 78) in Tremont. MS 23 ends at the Mississippi–Alabama state line, just west of Red Bay.

The routing that became part of MS 23 was first constructed as a graded road in 1925, from north of Amory to the state line. Gravel was added to sections of the route in the 1930s. The designation was added to maps around 1950, and it was extended to Smithville in 1960. The route was fully paved by 1980.

Route description

The highway is located in northern Monroe and eastern Itawamba counties. MS 23 is legally defined in Mississippi Code § 65-3-3, and is maintained by the Mississippi Department of Transportation as part of the state highway system. The section of the route from Tremont to the Mississippi–Alabama state line is designated as Tammy Wynette Memorial Highway, named after the country music singer–songwriter who grew up near Tremont.

MS 23 starts at an intersection with MS 25 in the town of Smithville and travels eastward. It leaves the city limits at Seminole Road and crosses Mill Creek shortly after. The road travels through a rural area, and turns northward at George Pearce Road. Past Jug Shop Road, MS 23 crosses the Itawamba County line. Upon entering the county, the route crosses Bluff Creek and travels northeastward. At Bull Mountain Road, the road enters a forest. Traveling past the community of Turon, the road turns further north into the county. Over the next few miles, MS 23 crosses over Smith and Jims creeks and travels toward Cadamy. The road travels north past Cadamy, turning into a divided highway. It meets I-22 and US 78 at a diamond interchange, just within the corporate limits of Tremont. Past the interchange, MS 23 changes back to a two-lane road and intersects MS 178, the beginning of a short concurrency through the town.

Once the concurrency begins, MS 23 and MS 178 travel westward through the center of Tremont. MS 23 departs from MS 178 to the north less than  later, ending the concurrency. It travels northeastward into the forest, and soon leaves the corporate limits. At Cotton Gin Road, MS 23 turns north, crosses Mountain Creek and intersects Mt. Gilead Road and Hartsell Road in the center of Bounds Crossroads. The route intersects the eastern terminus of MS 76 and later parallels that divided highway. MS 23 shifts slightly north past Pineville Road, and it ends at the Mississippi–Alabama state line. Past this point, County Road 3, also known as Tammy Wynette Memorial Highway, continues to Red Bay in Franklin County, Alabama.

History
The MS 23 designation was used for another route from 1932 to 1940. The routing was from Starkville to Shannon when it was first designated. The section from Shannon to Okolona was paved by 1937. The next year,  of the route was paved from West Point southwards. MS 25 was extended south in 1939, replacing all of MS 23 from Starkville to north of West Point. The MS 23 designation was replaced with the MS 45W one by 1940. MS 45W was renumbered in 1968 to US 45 Alternate, its current designation.

The earliest sections of the current routing of MS 23 have existed since 1925, and the road that became MS 23 was part of the state map in 1928 as a graded road. The road traveled from north of Amory to the state line. The section from US 78 northward was paved in gravel by 1933. It was straightened out and extended southwestward three years later. The route designation re-appeared on the state map by 1950. A small section near Tremont was paved five years later, and the majority of the route was paved by 1957. MS 23 was extended to MS 25 and Smithville along a gravel road, and the entire section north of US 78 was paved in 1960. The Monroe County section of the route was paved in 1965, and a part of the route south of Tremont was paved in 1973. The entire route was paved by 1980. In 1991, US 78 was rerouted onto a divided highway, and a new interchange was constructed at MS 23. A part of the Appalachian Development Highway System, Corridor V, was constructed to MS 23 by 2014.

Major intersections

References

023
Transportation in Monroe County, Mississippi
Transportation in Itawamba County, Mississippi